Ryvangen Memorial Park is a memorial park in Ryvangen officially inaugurated on 5 May 1950 to commemorate fallen members of the Danish resistance to the German occupation of Denmark during World War II.

The location in Ryvangen, which means "rye field", was acquired in 1893 by the army for a barracks and exercise field.

On 29 August 1943, when the Danish cooperation with Germany broke down the German occupying forces seized the army and naval facilities in all of Denmark including Ryvangen.

While the German army used the barracks for themselves, part of the exercise field was used as an execution and burial site for members of the Danish resistance.

The execution site consisted of three wooden poles to which the condemned were tied and executed by firing squad.

On 5 May 1945, in connection with the liberation, members of the resistance came to Ryvangen and only then did the public get confirmation that the executions of the German occupying forces had taken place there.

The Comrades' Relief Fund writes that, on 5 May, members of the resistance discovered 202 graves in Ryvangen and that the minister for ecclesiastical affairs had the remains exhumed for identification. In a number of cases, the parish registers cited below state that the remains were brought to the Department of Forensic Medicine of the university of Copenhagen for an inquest. 27 bodies were actually found weeks after 5 May, with 25 found between one and two months after the liberation. One of the bodies found could not be identified while one exhumed body was identified as a Rottenführer of the SS.

The inquests at the Department of Forensic Medicine showed that at least 19 men mentioned in the parish registers of Bethlehem, Bispebjerg, Holmen, Vor Frelser, Års and Sct. Markus, Ålborg were executed with shots to the chest, with seven men each receiving from three to seven gunshot wounds.

After the liberation the site was converted to a cemetery and memorial park for the resistance members who were executed there or were otherwise killed. In connection with the burials there, the site was referred to as Mindekirkegaarden i Ryvangen (Ryvangen Memorial Cemetery). The bereaved could choose to have the remains buried at the memorial park or at a cemetery closer to home.

On 29 August 1945, two years after the German occupiers had dissolved the Danish army and navy, 106 hearses thus drove from the Christiansborg Riding Grounds through Copenhagen to the memorial park in Ryvangen with the flags in the city flying half-mast. Bishop Hans Fuglsang-Damgaard inaugurated the park as a cemetery with the Danish Royal Family, the government and representatives from the resistance movement present at the funerals.

In the center of the grave field lies a memorial stone for the 91 resistance members who were exhumed in Ryvangen and buried in a cemetery closer to home.

The remains of 31 resistance members who died in German prisons and concentration camps are also buried here. The pergola along the eastern border of the park has a memorial wall with 151 plaques, one for each of the 151 Danish resistance members whose remains have never been found.

On 24 December 1949 the newly formed Home Guard held a memorial service for the victims of the occupation in the memorial park. Every Christmas Eve since then the Home Guard holds a memorial service there.

History
Arne Sørensen, minister for ecclesiastical affairs, took the initiative to create the memorial park at the former execution and burial site. The park was designed by Kaj Gottlob, the garden by Aksel Andersen. On 5 May 1950, five years after the liberation, the park was finished and officially inaugurated. On every liberation day since then, the Comrades' Help Foundation holds a memorial service in the park.

Monuments and memorials

The sculptor Axel Poulsen created the monument For Denmark / The mother with the slain son located centrally in the park.

In addition to the tombstones, the park has a number of memorial stones and plaques, with a large communal plaque at the center. At the execution site the wooden execution poles were replaced by bronze duplicates, and a commemorative plaque with a verse by Kaj Munk has been laid down there. The inscription translates literally to:
Boys you boys who died
You lit for Denmark
in the darkest gloom
a shining rosy dawn

().

Burials

The large grave field with 106 graves 
In addition to the 105 resistance members listed below, Harald Christensen was buried in Mindelunden on 29 August 1945. However, in 1950 prior to the official inauguration of the park, his remains were exhumed a second time and moved, leaving his grave empty. Similarly, Estvan Svend Aage Wehlast was buried in Mindelunden on 29 August 1945, but less than a year later exhumed a second time and reburied elsewhere. The official list of resistance members buried in Ryvangen does not include Christensen nor Wehlast.

The memorial stone for 91 fallen resistance members

The Memorial Wall for 151 missing resistance members

The 31 KZ graves

Others exhumed in Ryvangen 
In addition to the  resistance members named above, the following were exhumed in Ryvangen after the liberation.

References

External links

 
 

Parks in Copenhagen
Cemeteries in Copenhagen
World War II memorials
World War II memorials in Denmark
1950 establishments in Denmark
Cemeteries established in the 1950s